Spirit River is a town in northern Alberta, Canada.

Demographics 

In the 2016 Census of Population conducted by Statistics Canada, the Town of Spirit River recorded a population of 995 living in 442 of its 487 total private dwellings, a  change from its 2011 population of 1,025.

Economy 
The community is largely agricultural, being located in the fertile Peace Country. It also features an active oil and gas industry.

History 
The name Spirit River comes from the Cree Chepe Sepe, or Ghost River.

In 1891, a trading post became the original settlement along the banks of the Spirit River. Ranching in the area started as early as the 1840s and farming in the 1880s. The first school opened in 1910. In 1915, to the northwest, on Section 22, the Edmonton, Dunvegan and British Columbia Railway subdivided a townsite called Spirit River Station. The residents and storekeepers at the old settlement then moved, creating a village in 1916. On February 16 of that year, the Herald Tribune reported that McRae & Co. opened a general store. Spirit River was incorporated as a town in 1951.

In 1923, the wheat pool was established.

In October 2013, a pipeline inspection crew working in the Saddle Hills area southwest of Spirit River unearthed a 10-metre long dinosaur fossil. It was later confirmed to be that of the duck-billed hadrosaur.

The Town of Spirit River, along with the Municipal District of Spirit River celebrated its 100th anniversary in August 2016.

Government 
The Municipal District of Spirit River No. 133's municipal office is located in Spirit River. It is also home to the Peace-Wapiti School Board and provincial offices for Alberta Agriculture and Fish and Wildlife.

Infrastructure 
Transportation
A paved airport accommodates medical emergency flights and private aircraft.

Recreation
The town features a curling rink, arena, outdoor pool, library, museum and community hall.

Health care
Spirit River is home to a hospital and the Central Peace Health Centre, a newly constructed clinic that has physician, dentist, physiotherapist and massage therapist offices. 
A new 92-bed seniors care home is set to open in 2024.

Education 
The town is home to two schools – Ste. Marie Catholic School (elementary) and Spirit River Regional Academy (K-12).

Sports 
The Spirit River Rangers of the North Peace Hockey League play out of the Maclean Rec Centre.

Notable people
 Hilarion Kapral, a bishop and First Hierarch of ROCOR
 Patricia Joudry, screenwriter.
 Tim Howar, singer and dancer, known as a London-based rock vocalist with Mike + the Mechanics
 Aaron Goodvin, country singer
 Frank Grigware, who escaped from Leavenworth Prison while serving a life sentence for train robbery, and was elected mayor in 1916 using the name James Fahey

See also 
List of communities in Alberta
List of towns in Alberta

References

External links 

1916 establishments in Alberta
Hudson's Bay Company trading posts
Municipal District of Spirit River No. 133
Towns in Alberta